Meda railway station is a railway station in Italy. Located on the Milan–Asso railway, it serves the town of Meda.

Services
Meda is served by line S2 of the Milan suburban railway network, and by the Milan–Asso regional line. Both of them are operated by the Lombard railway company Trenord.

See also
 Milan suburban railway network

References

External links
 
 Ferrovienord official site - Meda railway station 

Railway stations in Lombardy
Ferrovienord stations
Railway stations opened in 1879
Milan S Lines stations
Meda, Lombardy